Sinlamaung is a river village in Homalin Township, Hkamti District, in the Sagaing Region of northwestern Burma. It is located southwest of Hkonsa. A Japanese garrison was stationed at Sinlamaung during World War II.

References

External links
Maplandia World Gazetteer

Populated places in Hkamti District
Homalin Township